Treaty of Madrid may refer to:
Treaty of Madrid (1339), collaboration between Aragon and Castile
Treaty of Madrid (1526), in which France renounced claims in Italy, surrendered Burgundy to Charles V, Holy Roman Emperor, and abandoned sovereignty over Flanders and Artois
Treaty of Madrid (1617), between the Holy Roman Empire and the Republic of Venice ending the Uskok War
Treaty of Madrid (1621), in which Valtelline was restored to the Bund and Protestants in the region were given religious freedoms
Treaty of Madrid (1630), in which England renounced supporting the rebels of the Spanish Netherlands and the Protestants in Germany
Treaty of Madrid (1667) or Lord Sandwich's Treaty, the first step in officially ending the Anglo-Spanish War (1654–1660)
Treaty of Madrid (1670), in which Spain recognized English possessions in the Caribbean Sea
Treaty of Madrid (13 January 1750), which settled boundaries between Spain and Portugal's colonies in South America
Treaty of Madrid (5 October 1750), between Spain and Britain was about the Asiento de Negros
Pinckney's Treaty or Treaty of Madrid (1795), which settled boundaries between the United States and Spain
Treaty of Madrid (1801), in which Portugal gives France an indemnity of 20 million francs and half of Guiana
Treaty of Madrid (1814), between Britain and Spain, following restoration of the Bourbon Monarchy
Treaty of Madrid (1817), act of sale of a Russian naval squadron to Spain
Treaty of Madrid (1880), between the Sultan of Morocco and other Powers
Treaty of Madrid (1891), giving France legal protection of the term "champagne"

See also
 Madrid Accords (1975), between Spain, Morocco, and Mauritania
Treaty of El Pardo (disambiguation), several treaties signed at the El Pardo Palace in Madrid might referred to as a Treaty of Madrid